Kagawa Prefectural Higashiyama Kaii Setouchi Art Museum is an art museum dedicated to Japanese painting master Kaii Higashiyama.  The museum is located in the city of Sakaide, Kagawa Prefecture, Japan, where Higashiyama's grandfather was born.  The museum features 350 works by Higashiyama that were donated by his wife after he died.

The museum was designed by famed architect Yoshio Taniguchi and opened in Sakaide in 2005. It is located near the Great Seto Bridge.

Access
The museum is a 15-minute bus ride from Sakaide Station.

References

External links
  Kagawa Prefectural Higashiyama Kaii Setouchi Art Museum

Museums in Kagawa Prefecture
Museums established in 2005
2005 establishments in Japan
Sakaide, Kagawa